Coleophora stepposa is a moth of the family Coleophoridae. It is found in southern Russia and Mongolia.

References

stepposa
Moths of Asia
Moths described in 1975